Charles Priestley (22 June 1916 – 26 September 1992) was an Australian rules footballer who played with Richmond in the Victorian Football League (VFL).

Priestley played in the back pocket for Richmond in their 1944 VFL Grand Final loss to Fitzroy. He missed selection in their premiership team the previous year. He continued to be involved with Richmond after his retirement, serving as a board member of 36 years. During that period he spent some time as chairman of selectors.

References

1916 births
1992 deaths
Australian rules footballers from Victoria (Australia)
Richmond Football Club players
Richmond Football Club administrators